Sometimes They Come Back... Again is a 1996 film directed by Adam Grossman and starring Michael Gross, Robert Arquette, and Hilary Swank. It is the straight-to-video sequel to the 1991 horror film Sometimes They Come Back.

Plot 
Psychologist Jon Porter (Michael Gross) learns that his mother has just mysteriously fallen to her death. Jon and his teenage daughter Michelle (Hilary Swank) return to Jon's hometown of Glenrock for his mother's funeral. Once there, painful memories return. Thirty years earlier, when Jon was a child, he witnessed the brutal murder of his older sister Lisa (Leslie Danon), who was stabbed to death in a cave by a thug named Tony Reno (Robert Arquette) and his two friends Vinnie (Bojesse Christopher) and Sean (Glen Beaudin). But Jon managed to throw an electrical wire into a puddle of bloody water they were standing in, killing all three of them.

Michelle becomes friends with mentally handicapped gardener Steve (Gabriel Dell Jr.), as well as two girls, boy-crazy Maria (Jennifer Aspen), and Maria's psychic best friend, Jules (Jennifer Elise Cox), who used to clean her grandmother's house. The night after the funeral, they invite Michelle to go to the diner with them, saying they would like to get to know her before she goes home for her 18th birthday. At the diner, the girls are greeted by a boy who looks a lot like Tony Reno, even with the same name. While Maria develops a crush on him, he seems to be attracted to Michelle. He gives Michelle an old wristwatch as an early birthday present, then leaves.

Meanwhile, Jon is pestered by Father Archer Roberts (W. Morgan Sheppard), a priest he came to when Lisa was murdered. He tells Jon his mother's death was not an accident.

It is revealed that Tony is the same thug that killed his sister and somehow came back from the dead. Tony kills Steve with his lawnmower and uses his body parts to perform a ritual in order to bring Vinnie and Sean back. Vinnie pretends to scare Tony away, making Maria fall in love with him. During a date, Vinnie turns into a Demon and kills Maria. Jules, whose psychic abilities upset Tony, worries about Maria and is taken to a bridge by Tony, Vinnie and Sean, who were disguised as the Sheriff and his deputies. Tony kills Jules by slashing her with her own tarot cards.

In the end, Jon reenacts the events of the murder of Lisa but saves Michelle and is able to use a ritual given to him by Father Roberts to banish Tony and his friends back to Hell.

Sequel
The video was followed by another straight-to-video sequel in 1998 titled, Sometimes They Come Back... for More.

External links
 
 
 

1996 films
American supernatural horror films
1996 horror films
Direct-to-video horror films
Direct-to-video sequel films
Demons in film
Trimark Pictures films
1990s English-language films
1990s American films